Lincoln Township is a township in Lucas County, Iowa, USA. It was established in 1876.

References

Townships in Lucas County, Iowa
Townships in Iowa